Adampur Mouchri is a village near the town of Khatauli in Muzaffarnagar district, Uttar Pradesh, India.

There is one primary school in Adampur Mouchri and two nursery schools.

Adampur Mouchri consists two major castes which are Gurjar and Saini. The total population of the village is near about 1000 people, distributed among 60 to 70 residences.

References 

Villages in Muzaffarnagar district